Thomas Prehn (born August 29,1957) is a retired American cyclist.

Palmares
1980
1st stage 11b Vuelta Ciclista de Chile
1986
 National Road Race Champion
1987 
1st Quad Cities
Author of book; Racing Tactics for Cyclists(2004)

References

1961 births
Living people
American male cyclists